Pedgaon is a major village and railway station in Parbhani district in Indian state of Maharashtra.

Demography
As per 2011 census, Pedgaon has total 1,525 families residing. Village has population of 7,708 of which 3,940 were males while 3,768 were females.
Average Sex Ratio of village is 956 which is higher than Maharashtra state average of 929.
Literacy rate of village was 68% compared to 82.95% of Maharashtra. Male literacy rate was 77% while female literacy rate was 59%.
Schedule Caste (SC) constitutes 15% of total population.

References

Villages in Parbhani district